Hippocampus fisheri, commonly known as Fisher's seahorse, or the Hawaiian seahorse, is a species of fish of the family Syngnathidae. It is known from the Hawaiian Islands, although previous misidentifications indicated species occurrences in Australia and New Caledonia. Feeding habits are also unknown, but individuals are expected to feed on small crustaceans similar to other seahorses. Hippocampus fisheri is one out of the three species of Hippocampus genus found in the Hawaiian islands. They are also expected to be ovoviviparous, with males carrying eggs in a brood pouch before giving birth to live young. The specific name and the common name honour "Walter V. Fisher” of Stanford University. There was a Walter Kenrick Fisher who was Jordan and Evermann’s colleague at Stanford and the “V” is assumed to be a typo.

References

Further reading
WoRMS
iSeahorse
IUCN Seahorse, Pipefish & Stickleback Specialist Group

Hippocampus (genus)
Fish of Hawaii

Taxa named by David Starr Jordan
Taxa named by Barton Warren Evermann
Fish described in 1903
Taxonomy articles created by Polbot